= International Medical Equipment Collaborative =

Nonprofit organization

- IMEC Logo
- Formation: 1995
- Type: Non-Governmental Organization (NGO)
- Headquarters: North Andover, Massachusetts, U.S.
- President: Thomas Keefe (Founder)(1995– )
- Volunteers: 4,000
- Website: www.imecamerica.org (inactive)

International Medical Equipment Collaborative (IMEC) is a 501(c)(3) non-profit organization that provides medical equipment to doctors and nurses working hospitals and clinics in impoverished areas worldwide. IMEC is in North Andover, Massachusetts, United States, where volunteers sort, repair, package and ship donated medical supplies and equipment to international medical personnel. Through partnerships with various humanitarian organizations IMEC has been delivering medical supplies for 14 years. IMEC is known for providing medical supplies that doctors request for their patients.

== History ==
Founded in 1995, IMEC started in the garage of now IMEC's president, Thomas Keefe. A former hospital administrator, Tom Keefe collected surplus medical equipment caused by hospitals closing, downsizing and eliminating entire services. With the help of humanitarian organizations, this acquired surplus was channeled to developing countries worldwide. Sustained mostly by volunteers, IMEC has grown extensively over the years refurbishing medical equipment and shipping worldwide.

"Between October 1996 and October 1997, IMEC brought about $1.6 million worth of equipment into its 30,000-square-foot (2,800 m^{2}) warehouse, which used to be a giant machine shop. It also relied on 10,000 hours of volunteer time from individuals and organizations such as churches and service groups."

In 2004, IMEC introduced the Center of Health Initiative where IMEC would work with shepherding organizations to identify an empty hospital and retrofit it with basic health care services. By using surplus equipment from hospitals and clinics in the United States, IMEC is able to keep costs low while still providing the equipment needed. IMEC collaborates with the shepherding organization to ensure customs papers for a country are properly completed, as well as securing an offloading procedure in the destination country.

"IMEC's Centers of Health Initiative provides developing nations with a replicable, integrated model for sustaining medical care and health education that is efficient and economical. These centers stabilize existing services, expand the range of services, improve access to health care, and advance the health status of the population over time."

IMEC moved from several small storage facilities to a 150,000-square-foot (14,000 m^{2}) warehouse in North Andover Massachusetts in 2007 where they are currently located. The warehouse serves as the collection, refurbishing and distribution center for IMEC. IMEC currently ships 75 containers to 75 countries yearly through numerous shepherding organizations.

IMEC has been consistently nominated for the "Gates Award for Global Health" given by the Bill and Melinda Gates Foundation. Additionally, recently, IMEC received the 2010 Amoud Foundation Annual Achievement Award (AAA).

== IMEC Process ==
IMEC operates under a 5-step plan: Assessment, Acquisition, Preparation, Packaging, and Shipping.

=== Assessment ===
The process begins when a shepherding group identifies a hospital in need and contacts IMEC to request service. IMEC's assessment volunteers have many years of experience in working with hospitals in the developing world. IMEC and the sponsoring humanitarian organization work with hospital personnel to assess the hospital's needs and to create a plan for its rejuvenation. The plan lists only the needed types of medical support – maternity, surgical, dental, eye care, etc. – and IMEC uses that plan to begin the process of equipment acquisition and preparation. Shepherding groups are often established humanitarian organizations, church groups, or in-country health system willing to support a project over a three- to five-year period.

=== Acquisition ===
The medical equipment and supplies that IMEC delivers come from a variety of sources. The majority of items donated to IMEC come from hospitals and medical equipment companies across the United States. Hospitals that are reorganizing often find themselves discarding fully functional medical devices that have been replaced with newer models. Medical equipment companies introducing new lines are left with unsold warehouse stock of discontinued devices. IMEC's Acquisition Department offers its services to these companies and hospitals by taking their surplus equipment and bringing it to IMEC, where it is distributed according to the needs of the different projects. From time to time, a required piece of equipment is not available from donations, so it is purchased from the manufacturers. Often, these manufacturers offer this equipment at a discount, in order to aid IMEC's mission.

=== Preparation ===
IMEC collects the equipment and brings it to its 150,000-square-foot (14,000 m^{2}) workshop and distribution center in North Andover, MA, where volunteers clean it, make sure it's fully functional, and organize it for suite assembly. Used equipment is repaired as needed by skilled technical volunteers, many of whom are retired electrical engineers and medical technicians. Linens and medical supplies are sorted and organized into packages designed by nurses and physicians for the requirements of each suite.

=== Packaging ===
IMEC's workshop volunteers organize the equipment and supplies into complete medical suites, packed onto pallets for shipment. For example, a labor and maternity suite includes all of the equipment and supplies necessary for a basic delivery room. Each suite is packed to fit onto pallets, taking one or two pallets per suite.

=== Shipping ===
Twenty pallets fit into a standard 40' container, which allows IMEC to ship between sixteen and twenty suites in one container—enough to completely equip a clinic. Nine containers will carry enough equipment, furnishings and supplies to equip an entire hospital.

== Volunteer-based organization ==
IMEC is made up of volunteers supported by a small staff. Funded by donations from individuals as well as corporations, IMEC is able to sustain its activities. IMEC's volunteers come from corporate service teams, retired medical professionals and interested individuals. This donation of time, effort, and expertise allows IMEC to efficiently and effectively carry out all aspects of the project. Experienced volunteers perform in-country hospital assessments and acquire needed medical equipment. Any necessary repairs to the equipment are done by volunteers who bring skill sets that include sewing, electronics, or the simple willingness to clean the marks of previous use. Volunteers perform the final packaging and shipping, down to the last act of loading the pallets by forklift into shipping containers destined for impoverished hospitals worldwide.

== IMEC Worldwide ==
Over the years IMEC has shipped many containers worldwide with numerous shepherding groups.

== Registration and funding in the United States ==
IMEC is a 501(c)(3)non-profit organization registered in the USAID Private Voluntary Organizations (PVO). IMEC was officially recognized by USAID on 23 November 2001 and a report of financial activities is presented within the registry. IMEC receives its funding from corporate grants and private donations.

== Donated equipment ==
IMEC is supported by private and corporate donations. Donations come in the form of medical equipment, volunteers and financial grants. The "Acquisition" step of IMEC's 5-step plan comes from a variety of corporate donors. Endoscopic tools, dental equipment, neonatal and pediatric products, stretchers, and furniture are some of the donated equipment IMEC collects and redistributes abroad.
